Wanelge Castillo (born 9 March 1945 in Panama City) is a Panamanian former wrestler who competed in the 1968 Summer Olympics and in the 1972 Summer Olympics. At the 1967 Pan American Games he finished second in the 52.0 kg. freestyle category. At the 1971 Pan American Games he finished third in the 52.0 kg. freestyle category.

References

External links
 

1945 births
Living people
Sportspeople from Panama City
Panamanian male sport wrestlers
Olympic wrestlers of Panama
Wrestlers at the 1968 Summer Olympics
Wrestlers at the 1972 Summer Olympics
Pan American Games silver medalists for Panama
Pan American Games bronze medalists for Panama
Pan American Games medalists in wrestling
Wrestlers at the 1971 Pan American Games
Medalists at the 1971 Pan American Games
20th-century Panamanian people
21st-century Panamanian people